The Renaissance Center (also known as the GM Renaissance Center and nicknamed the RenCen) is a group of seven connected skyscrapers in Downtown Detroit, Michigan, United States. The Renaissance Center complex is on the Detroit International Riverfront and is owned and used by General Motors as its world headquarters. The central tower has been the tallest building in Michigan since it was erected in 1977.

John Portman was the principal architect for the original design. The first phase consisted of a five-tower rosette rising from a common base. Four 39-story office towers surround the 73-story hotel rising from a square podium which includes a shopping center, restaurants, brokers, and banks. The first phase officially opened in March 1977. Portman's design brought renewed attention to city architecture, since it resulted in construction of the world's tallest hotel at the time. Two additional 21-story office towers (known as Tower 500 and Tower 600) opened in 1981. This type of complex has been termed a city within a city.

In 2004, General Motors completed a US$500 million renovation of the Class-A center as its world headquarters, which it had purchased in 1996. The renovation included the addition of the five-story Wintergarden atrium, which provides access to the International Riverfront. Architects for the renovation included Skidmore, Owings & Merrill, Gensler, SmithGroup, and Ghafari Associates. Work continued in and around the complex until 2005. Renaissance Center totals  making it one of the world's largest commercial complexes.

In July 2015, the complex was re-branded as "The GMRENCEN." Its logo was modernized and "Reflecting a New Detroit" was introduced as the new tagline. A photo-journalistic advertising campaign launched to "shine a spotlight on the people in Detroit who make remarkable contributions" to the city.

Despite the name, the hotel portion is not affiliated with the Renaissance Hotels chain, also owned by Marriott. An unrelated Renaissance Hotel does exist in the suburb of Novi however.

History

The idea was first conceived by Henry Ford II, the Ford Motor Company Chairman of the time. In 1970, to bring his idea to life, Ford teamed up with other business leaders to form the Detroit Renaissance. This was a private non-profit development organization which Ford headed in order to stimulate building activity and revitalize the economy of Detroit. Henry Ford II sold the concept of the RenCen to the City and community leaders. Detroit Mayor Roman Gribbs touted the project as a complete rebuilding from bridge to bridge, referring to the area between the Ambassador Bridge, that connects Detroit to Windsor, Ontario, and the MacArthur Bridge, which connects the city with Belle Isle Park.

The Detroit Renaissance announced the first phase of construction in 1971, receiving primary financing from the Ford Motor Company. It soon became the world's largest private development with an anticipated 1971 cost of $500 million. The principal architect was John Portman, the architect behind the Westin Peachtree Plaza Hotel and the Peachtree Center in Atlanta, Georgia; the Embarcadero Center in San Francisco, California; and the Bonaventure Hotel in Los Angeles, California.

The city within a city arose. The first phase of Renaissance Center opened on July 1, 1976. This did not include the additional glass used for the atriums. It also cost $337 million to construct, employing 7,000 workers. The heating and cooling systems for the buildings were housed in two-story concrete berms facing Jefferson Avenue. Other phases that included residences, additional office and retail space were never constructed.

When the Renaissance Center opened, the cylindrical central tower was originally the flagship of Westin Hotels. The top three floors of the hotel hosted an upscale restaurant, The Summit, that rotated to allow a 360 degree view. The shopping center in the podium originally housed high-end boutiques, but now contains a greater complement of restaurants in the retail mix.

In 1977, managed by Western International Hotels, the central hotel tower of the Renaissance Center opened as the Detroit Plaza Hotel. It became the world's tallest all-hotel skyscraper surpassing its architectural twin, the Westin Peachtree Plaza Hotel in Atlanta. The hotel was later renamed The Westin Hotel Renaissance Center Detroit. In 1986, it was surpassed in height by The Westin Stamford in Singapore. Since, the Renaissance Center's central tower has held the distinction as the tallest all-hotel skyscraper in the Western Hemisphere.

On April 15, 1977, Henry Ford II and Detroit mayor Coleman Young unveiled a plaque commemorating the private investors whose funds made the project possible. Later that evening, 650 business and society leaders attended a benefit to celebrate the Renaissance Center's formal dedication. The money raised from the $300-per-couple tickets went to the Detroit Symphony Orchestra. 

In 1980, Detroit hosted the Republican National Convention, during this event both presidential nominee Ronald Reagan and former President Gerald Ford stayed at the Renaissance Center.

The "city within a city" concept was duplicated in the suburb of Southfield, when the Southfield Town Center office complex - with five inter-connected golden skyscrapers and an overall area of  - was constructed from 1975 to 1989. In the ensuing years, the Renaissance Center would face competition from the growing suburban office market.

In 1987, the elevated Detroit People Mover transit line began operation with a stop at the Renaissance Center.

In 1996, General Motors purchased the complex and moved its world headquarters from what is now the historic Cadillac Place state office complex in the New Center district, to the Renaissance Center, in downtown Detroit. Meanwhile, Ford Motor Company maintained offices in one of the towers in the center. Before the acquisition, Sibley's Shoes had its headquarters in the center.

Architects' initial design for the Renaissance Center focused on creating secure interior spaces, while its design later expanded and improved to connect with the exterior spaces and waterfront through a reconfigured interior, open glass entryways, and a winter garden. By 2004, GM completed an extensive $500 million renovation of the Renaissance Center. This included a $100 million makeover for the hotel. Among GM's first actions was to remove the concrete berms facing Jefferson Avenue. The renovation includes a lighted glass walkway which encircles the interior mezzanine for ease of navigation, while the addition of the winter garden provides riverfront access and a view of Canada. A covered skyway over Jefferson Avenue connects to the Millender Center, Courtyard by Marriott - Downtown Detroit, and Coleman A. Young Municipal Center.

In July 2010, Blue Cross Blue Shield of Michigan announced plans to lease  of Tower 500 and Tower 600 and relocate 3,000 of its employees from its building in Southfield, Michigan.

In January 2015, General Motors announced its intent to renovate much of the complex to make it more inviting as a destination for visitors to Detroit.

In 2018, the GM World showroom was renovated.

The Renaissance Center is owned by General Motors. The hotel in the central tower is now managed by the Marriott hotel chain and is called the Detroit Marriott at the Renaissance Center. The 1,298-room hotel is one of the largest operated by Marriott. The rooftop restaurant (which previously had revolved) received a $10 million renovation and was operated by The Epicurean Groups's Coach Insignia (closed in 2017). It served Coach wines, a product of the Fisher family whose legacy includes Fisher Body, a name which is part of GM history.

The Renaissance Center's renovation provides for the prospect of continued development and restorations throughout the city. Architectural critics have touted the city's architecture as among North America's finest.

In its first year of operation it generated over $1 billion in economic growth for the downtown. Detroit Renaissance continued to interact with the city, by contributing to a variety of projects within the downtown area in the ensuing decades.

Location

The Renaissance Center is a riverfront property located along the Detroit River. Approximately one-mile north of the center are Comerica Park and Ford Field, the respective venues for the Detroit Tigers and Detroit Lions. The US portal of the Detroit-Windsor Tunnel emerges adjacent to the western boundary of the Renaissance Center. The Renaissance Center is also a station on the Detroit People Mover. Additionally a pedestrian skyway, over Jefferson Avenue, connects the complex to the Millender Center. Several blocks to the west of the Renaissance Center, along Jefferson Avenue, there are the Coleman A. Young Municipal Center, Hart Plaza, Huntington Place (formerly Cobo Center, home to events such as the North American International Auto Show and Youmacon) and the Joe Louis Arena (former home of the Detroit Red Wings). The University of Detroit Mercy School of Law is located just across Jefferson Avenue. The Renaissance Center's modernist architecture balances the city's panoramic waterfront skyline, a frequent feature in photography taken from Windsor, Ontario, across the river. From the top of Renaissance Center's previous Coach Insignia restaurant (closed in 2017), patrons were able to peer down upon the neogothic spires of the One Detroit Center and the city's Financial District skyscrapers and stadiums.

Architecture
The centerpiece is the 73-story 727-foot (221.5 m) luxury hotel with 1,246 rooms and 52 suites (1298 total guest rooms). Its height is measured from its main Wintergarden entrance on Atwater Street which faces the International Riverfront where the complex measures  taller. Entirely owned by General Motors, the complex has  of space. The main Renaissance Center complex rises from a  site. The complex is designed in the modern architectural style with glass as a main material.

A lighted glass walkway radiates the mezzanine level and encircles the base of cylindrical hotel tower for ease of navigation. It links to several other walkways in the complex. The five-story Wintergarden atrium leads into the central area which has an eight-story atrium lobby with rounded concrete balconies and terraces. The Highlands is located on Floors 71 through 73, which includes a restaurant, scotch bar, and special events space. The hotel has no floors labeled 7, 8, or 13.

John Portman designed the five-building rosette with interior spaces. In 1977, its central tower opened as the tallest hotel in the world. It remains the tallest all hotel skyscraper in the Western Hemisphere. The smaller cylinders on sides of all the towers house the elevators. A portion of the central atrium area houses GM World, a showcase for GM vehicles. Two 21-story towers (500–600), designed by Portman and constructed in 1981, reach 339 feet (103 m). GM gained control of Towers 500 and 600 in 2001. Tower 500 has  of office space and an additional  of retail space. Tower 600 has  of office space and an additional  of retail space.

Towers 100 and 200 front Jefferson Avenue. Towers 300 and 400 are on the main Wintergarden/Atwater Street entrance facing the Riverfront. The GM Renaissance Conference Center is located on the second floor of tower 300.

In December 2001, the General Motors unveiled the Wintergarden retail atrium.

The design is consistent with the themes of Brutalist architecture, especially in the heavy massing of concrete on the lower floors, but the 2001 renovation has softened those features.

Redevelopment

The redevelopment project included the work of many different architects including Skidmore, Owings & Merrill of Chicago, SmithGroup of Detroit, and Ghafari Associates of Dearborn who did the renovation of the office towers. The majority of the construction operations were led by Turner Construction Company. The structural glass and steel for the Wintergarden, the entrance lobby as well as the mezzanine glass walkway were contributed by Mero. The cost of the renovation does not include the cost for reconfiguring the streets around the Renaissance Center or the cost of the park along the International Riverfront.

The $500 million renovation of the Renaissance Center completed in 2003 has helped improve Detroit's economy. Together, GM's renovation of the Renaissance Center and the Detroit Riverwalk exceeded $1 billion; the project constituted a substantial investment in downtown. More than 10,000 people (of whom 6,000 are GM employees) work in the complex. Nearly 2,000 state workers now occupy GM's former office building, the restored Cadillac Place, in the historic New Center district.

The Wintergarden added to the Renaissance Center faces the Riverfront and provides panoramic views of the Windsor skyline. The complex connects offices, the hotel, retail specialty shops, restaurants, a jazz club, and a movie theater. The theater has since closed and been converted to offices. A pedestrian-friendly glass entryway has replaced the former concrete berms along Jefferson Avenue. The redevelopment provides the GM World display of vehicles, a restored hotel, a renovated rooftop restaurant, and the addition of GM's corporate logo to crown the top of the building. Construction of the lighted glass walkway facilitates ease of navigation encircling the interior mezzanine. Hines completed redevelopment of Towers 500 and 600 for GM in 2004.

The Riverfront Promenade was dedicated on December 17, 2004, and helped to usher in a return to recreational uses along Detroit's International Riverfront. GM played a key role in the transformation of the east riverfront with a donation of $135 million to the Detroit Riverfront Conservancy for the development of a world class riverfront promenade planned at $559 million, which included $50 million from the Kresge foundation. In 2011, the Detroit Wayne County Port Authority opened its new state of the art cruise ship dock and passenger terminal on Hart Plaza, adjacent to the Renaissance Center. Port authority bonds financed another 1,500 space parking garage adjacent to the Renaissance Center. Further upriver, the Roberts Riverwalk Hotel faces the east riverfront. In addition to the gradual continuation of the riverfront promenade, other planned projects complementing the Renaissance Center continue along the International Riverfont which include development of luxury condominiums, a cruise ship passenger terminal, retail, and entertainment venues.

In 2011, the Renaissance Center added colored LED lighting on the top of its towers (Towers 500 and 600 utilize traditional blue floodlights to illuminate their top floors). General Motors added a large illuminated LED corporate logo which also displays GM divisions. The animated logo and illuminated LED color bands around the towers can be used to support special events and may be seen from Comerica Park, home of the Detroit Tigers. The renovation of TCF Center convention and exhibit facility incorporates similar blue neon lighting along riverfront promenade.

Technical details and tenants

In June 2015 the Ren Cen 4 Theatres theater complex announced that it was closing. With the end of Ren Cen 4, the city of Detroit has one first-run theater remaining, along with three independent theaters.

In July 2007 portions of Asian Village, a development of restaurants in Suite 2653 in the GM Center (200 Renaissance Center) with Asian cuisine offered, opened. The center was designed to evoke street food stalls within East and Southeast Asia.

In popular culture

The opening scenes of Thunder in the Skies, the seventh episode of the BBC science-history documentary Connections by James Burke, were visibly filmed in the then-new Renaissance Center (1978).

The Renaissance Center is featured in the film Action Jackson (1988).

In the film Collision Course starring Jay Leno and Pat Morita, the Renaissance Center is featured when Morita's character and Leno meet for the first time; Morita is considered a suspect and chased through the hotel (1989).

The 2008 crime thriller Killshot features an opening scene in which Mickey Rourke drives a blue Cadillac along Jefferson Avenue in Downtown Detroit where, in his role as hired hitman Armand Degas - nicknamed "Blackbird" - he enters the Marriott Hotel in the Renaissance Center to assassinate a mafia leader called "Papa", played by actor Hal Holbrook.

The film Bird on a Wire (starring Mel Gibson and Goldie Hawn) shot a chase scene inside the Renaissance Center (1990).

The opening scene of Renaissance Man shows Danny DeVito driving down Jefferson Avenue, late for a business meeting at the Renaissance Center, when he receives the phone call that fires him from his job. (1994).

The Renaissance Center is featured in the film Grosse Pointe Blank (1997).

In the Steven Soderbergh film adaptation of Out of Sight, the main characters meet in the revolving restaurant atop the Renaissance Center. The scene was filmed on location (1998).

The Renaissance Center was featured in the Kevin Costner and Joan Allen film The Upside of Anger. Costner's character plays a DJ for WRIF 101 FM, a real Detroit FM rock station, whose studio (in the film) is housed in the Renaissance Center (2004).

For the 2005 Major League Baseball All-Star Game, which was played at Comerica Park in Detroit, the center tower of the Renaissance Center was wrapped with an image of a large baseball smashing into the tower, with "4,612 FT" written below it to indicate the distance from home plate at Comerica Park. For Super Bowl XL, held at Detroit's Ford Field on February 5, 2006, a large National Football League logo was wrapped around the main tower just beneath the GM logo.

The Renaissance Center also hosted the major media for Super Bowl XL. GM offered the Wintergarden a venue for the annual Fash Bash, a fashion event and fundraiser coordinated by the Detroit Institute of Arts.

The History Channel's Life After People: The Series "Roads to Nowhere" episode featured the Renaissance Center.

It was used as a primary filming location for the film Real Steel, starring Hugh Jackman (2011).

In a book by Adrian Humphreys titled The Weasel: A Double Life in the Mob, the former driver of Jimmy Hoffa and a mob associate Marvin "The Weasel" Elkind stated that Hoffa is buried in the foundations of the Renaissance Center (2011).

The series finale of Motor City Masters was filmed in the GM World exhibit in the lower level of the Renaissance Center in 2014.

The Renaissance Center was prominently featured in a scene from the movie Need for Speed (2014).

The alternate cover of the Eminem album Recovery features the Renaissance Center in the background.

Eminem's greatest hits album Curtain Call 2 (2022) album cover also features the Renaissance Center.

See also

 Architecture of metropolitan Detroit
 List of tallest buildings in Detroit
 List of tallest buildings in Michigan
 List of tallest buildings in the United States
 List of largest buildings in the world

References

Further reading

External links

 
 Virtual visit of the Renaissance Center
 Building the Detroit Renaissance Center at Wayne State University Library is a digitized and searchable collection of photographs that documents the construction of the Renaissance Center.

Skyscraper office buildings in Detroit
Downtown Detroit
Shopping malls in Wayne County, Michigan
Skyscraper hotels in Detroit
Twin towers
Hotel buildings completed in 1977
Office buildings completed in 1977
Shopping malls established in 1977
Buildings and structures with revolving restaurants
General Motors facilities
Headquarters in the United States
Marriott hotels
Economy of Detroit
1977 establishments in Michigan
1970s architecture in the United States
Skidmore, Owings & Merrill buildings
John C. Portman Jr. buildings